Hadiyanto Wirawan (born 31 March 1955) is an Indonesian former badminton player.

About 
A former national champion, Hadiyanto is best remembered for his win over top seed Prakash Padukone in 1980 World Championships in quarterfinals. Padukone was heavy favourite for the tournament but was denied by Hadiyanto in two straight games 15–11, 15–13. In the semifinals he lost to legendary Rudy Hartono and bagged the bronze medal. Hadiyanto played in the final tie of 1982 Asian Games where Indonesian team won the silver medal and was also a part of team that won the 1984 Thomas Cup, beating China in the final.

Achievements

World Championships 
Men's singles

International tournaments 
Men's singles

Men's doubles

References 

1955 births
Living people
People from Pekalongan
Indonesian male badminton players
Badminton players at the 1982 Asian Games
Asian Games silver medalists for Indonesia
Asian Games medalists in badminton
Medalists at the 1982 Asian Games
21st-century Indonesian people
20th-century Indonesian people
Competitors at the 1981 World Games